Weaver House may refer to:

in the United States (by state);
Lee Weaver House, Hardy, AR, listed on the NRHP in Arkansas
Henry Weaver House, Santa Monica, CA, listed on the NRHP in California
James B. Weaver House, Bloomfield, IA, listed on the NRHP in Iowa
Weaver-Fox House, Uniontown, MD, listed on the NRHP in Maryland
Julian A. Weaver House, Granite Falls, MN, listed on the NRHP in Minnesota
Gov. Arthur J. Weaver House, Falls City, NE, listed on the NRHP in Nebraska
Myron Weaver House, Branchport, NY, listed on the NRHP in New York
Solomon Weaver House, Branchport, NY, listed on the NRHP in New York
Gen. John G. Weaver House, Utica, NY, listed on the NRHP in New York
William Weaver House, Piney Creek, NC, listed on the NRHP in North Carolina
Weaver-Worthington Farmstead, Canyonville, OR, listed on the NRHP in Oregon
Valentine Weaver House, Macungie, PA, listed on the NRHP in Pennsylvania
Henry Weaver Farmstead, Terre Hill, PA, listed on the NRHP in Pennsylvania
Weber-Weaver Farm, West Lampeter, PA, listed on the NRHP in Pennsylvania
Clement Weaver-Daniel Howland House, East Greenwich, RI, listed on the NRHP in Rhode Island
Weaver House (Cowie Corner, Virginia), listed on the NRHP in Virginia
Lawrence and Lydia Weaver House, Spokane, WA, listed on the NRHP in Washington